The Bangabandhu National Agriculture Award is a Bangladeshi award given to recognise a substantial contribution in the field of research in agricultural development. The medal is categorised into gold, silver and bronze medals.

This award was started in 1973 under the Ministry of Agriculture of Bangladesh. The award was stopped in 1975 and restarted in 2009.

See also

 List of agriculture awards

References 

Civil awards and decorations of Bangladesh
Agriculture awards
Awards established in 1973
Agriculture in Bangladesh